The Osella PA20 and Osella PA20/S are Group CN sports prototype race cars, designed, developed and built by Italian manufacturer Osella; which was first made in 1994. It weighs . It has competed mostly in timed hillcimb events and trials, but in its road racing career, it scored a total of 2 race wins, 4 podium finishes. It was briefly converted to a WSC, to comply with the FIA's regulations.

References 

Sports prototypes
BMW vehicles
Osella vehicles
Mid-engined cars